Kisey Apna Kahein is a Pakistani television serial that originally aired on Hum TV during 2014. Produced by Momina Duraid under MD Productions, it marked the debut of actress Iqra Aziz. The show was also rebroadcast in India on TV channel Zindagi from 28 May 2015 under the title Badalte Rishtey.

Synopsis
Kisay Apna Kahein explores the story of a middle-class family. The serial highlights the story of a father who has four daughters and wants to take decisions to ensure a bright future for each of them. Unfortunately, his decisions prove far from perfect.

The show focuses on human psychology, lust, love, care and difficulties existing in society.

Cast 
 Shabbir Jan as Hashim
 Rubina Ashraf as Zainab, Hashim's wife
 Arij Fatyma as Alizeh, Hashim and Zainab's first daughter
 Ishita Mehboob as Iqra, Hashim and Zainab's second daughter
 Hiba Ali as Maheen, Hashim and Zainab's third daughter
 Iqra Aziz as Shanzey, Hashim and Zainab's fourth daughter
 Danish Taimoor as Ali, Alizeh's love interest
 Humayoun Ashraf as Salman
 Birjees Farooqui as Ali's mother
 Parveen Akbar as Jabi's mother
 Seemi Pasha as Hashim's sister
 Farah Nadir as Salman's mother
 Hasan Ahmed

References

External links 
 Official Hum TV website

2014 Pakistani television series debuts
Pakistani drama television series
Urdu-language television shows
Hum TV original programming
Hum TV